The Hanshin Juvenile Fillies (阪神ジュベナイルフィリーズ) is a one-mile turf stakes race for thoroughbred fillies two years old. It is considered the de facto year-end championship for Japanese thoroughbred racing in the two-year-old fillies division.

Qualifying Races 
Artemis Stakes
Fantasy Stakes
Keio Hai Nisai Stakes

Winners

See also
 Horse racing in Japan
 List of Japanese flat horse races

References 
Racing Post: 

External links 
 Horse Racing in Japan

Flat horse races for two-year-old fillies
Horse races in Japan
Turf races in Japan